Baack is a Frisian surname, a diminutive of the French surname Baud. Notable people with the surname include:

Tom Baack (born 1999), German footballer
Lawrence J. Baack (born 1943), American historian
Steve Baack (born 1960), former professional American football player

References

Surnames of Frisian origin